Ismailia Governorate is one of the Canal Zone governorates of Egypt. Located in the northeastern part of the country, its capital is the city of Ismailia. It was named after Ismail Pasha, who as Ottoman Viceroy of Egypt, oversaw the country during the building of the Suez Canal. It is located between the other two Canal governorates; Port Said Governorate, in the Northern part of Egypt and Suez Governorate.

Municipal divisions
The governorate is divided into municipal divisions, with a total estimated population as of July 2017 of 1,309,474. In the case of Ismailia governorate, there are 4 kism, 5 markaz and 1 new city.

The divisions are generally seven: Ismailia which is the capital, Tell El Kebir, Abu Suwir,  Qassasin, Fayid, Qantara West and Qantara East.

Population
According to population estimates, in 2015 the majority of residents in the governorate lived in rural areas, with an urbanization rate of only 45.4%. Out of an estimated 1,178,641 people residing in the governorate, 643,778 people lived in rural areas as opposed to only 534,863 in urban areas.

Cities and towns
As of 2017, seven cities (or towns) in Ismailia had a population of over 15,000 inhabitants.

Industrial zones
According to the Egyptian Governing Authority for Investment and Free Zones (GAFI), in affiliation with the Ministry of Investment (MOI), the following industrial zones are located in this governorate:
Al Qantara Shark 
The 1st industrial zone
Technology Valley
The 2nd industrial zone
Abu Khalifa

Annual film festival
Hashim El Nahas founded the Ismailia International Film Festival for Documentaries and Shorts and originally considered establishing it in Luxor. Instead this festival has been celebrating its annual events in Ismailia Governorate. It is sponsored by the Ministry of Culture, Ismailia Governorate, The National Cinema Center and other sponsors.

Ismailia Canal
The Ismailia Governorate is on the banks of the Suez Canal and its Ismailia Canal extends from the Nile River near Cairo, to the Suez Canal at the city of Ismailia, on Lake Timsah. The Ismailia Canal was built to provide fresh water to workers during the building of the Suez Canal. The Suez Canal Authority headquarters is located in Ismailia.

Conflicts and wars
From 1967 to 1970, Ismailia became a war zone and was damaged in the conflict with Israel. Many battles were fought, in and around Ismailia, including at the end of the conflict in the Battle of Ismailia and the area was able to begin rebuilding after a cease-fire was negotiated between Egypt and Israel in 1973.

Fishing landing sites
There are several official fishing landing sites in Ismailia. One is at Lake Timsah and the other at Bitter Lake.

UN sustainable programme
After a successful SIP (Sustainable Ismailia Programme) from 1992 to 1997, the United Nations expanded the project to include the entire Governorate of Ismailia calling it SGIP (Sustainable Ismailia Governorate Programme). Its goal is to work with local partners to improve the communities in Ismailia.

References

Further reading
"Ismailia – Egypt's Garden City", Community Times Magazine
 Water Polo Legends: 1930's in Ismailia, Egypt

External links

Official Ismailia Governorate
Ismailia Governorate - Tourism
Tour Egypt, Ismailia Governorate Sites
Supreme Council of Antiquities, Ismailia Museum
 Ismailia Governorate on Facebook
 El Watan News of Ismailia Governorate

 
Governorates of Egypt